Oud Ootmarsum is a hamlet in the Dutch province of Overijssel. It is a part of the municipality of Dinkelland, and lies about 12 km north of Oldenzaal and very close to Ootmarsum.

Oud Ootmarsum is a statistical entity and has its own postal code, however it is considered a hamlet. The hamlet is the predecessor of the city of Ootmarsum, and was first mentioned in 1384 as Olde Oetmarsum. In 1840, it was home to 245 people.

The partially timber-framed building style of barns and farmhouses here is closely related to the building style of the Low German house.

Gallery

References

Populated places in Overijssel
Dinkelland